The Vallecito Mountains are located in the Colorado Desert, in eastern San Diego County, Southern California.

Geography
The mountains lie in Anza-Borrego Desert State Park, in an east–west direction, southwest of the community of Ocotillo Wells, and south of Highway 78.

The Laguna Mountains are to the southwest and Volcan Mountains to the northwest, and the Pinyon Mountains and Borrego Valley are on the north side. The Sawtooth Mountains, Tierra Blanca Mountains and Jacumba Mountains ranges lie to the south and southeast.

References

 

Mountain ranges of the Colorado Desert
Mountain ranges of San Diego County, California
Anza-Borrego Desert State Park